Bulgaria competed at the 2022 World Games held in Birmingham, United States from 7 to 17 July 2022. Athletes representing Bulgaria won one gold medal, one silver medal and one bronze medal. The country finished in 40th place in the medal table.

Medalists

Competitors
The following is the list of number of competitors in the Games.

Aerobic gymnastics

Bulgaria competed in aerobic gymnastics and take bronze in pairs.

Karate

Bulgaria competed in karate.

Women

Kickboxing

Bulgaria competed in kickboxing.

Parkour

Bulgaria competed in parkour gymnastics.

Rhythmic gymnastics

Bulgaria competed in rhythmic gymnastics and takes gold and silver.

Sumo

Bulgaria competed in sumo.

Weight categories
Men

Openweight
Main rounds

References

Nations at the 2022 World Games
2022
World Games